Olha Bohdanivna Zhovnir (born 8 June 1989) is a Ukrainian fencer and member of the team which won the gold medal in sabre at the 2008 Summer Olympics.

The Ukrainian team (she has stayed a member of) won gold in the Sabre final beating Russia during the 2010 European Fencing Championship. At the 2009 World Fencing Championships Zhovnir and her teammates beat France to win gold. The team won the title "Team of the Year" at the (Ukrainian) "Sports Heroes of the Year 2009" ceremony in April 2010.

References

1989 births
People from Netishyn
Living people
Ukrainian female sabre fencers
Armed Forces sports society (Ukraine) athletes
Fencers at the 2008 Summer Olympics
Olympic fencers of Ukraine
Olympic gold medalists for Ukraine
Olympic medalists in fencing
Medalists at the 2008 Summer Olympics
Fencers at the 2015 European Games
European Games medalists in fencing
European Games gold medalists for Ukraine
Sportspeople from Khmelnytskyi Oblast
20th-century Ukrainian women
21st-century Ukrainian women